Butyne is an alkyne that contains 4 carbon and 6 hydrogen. It contains  one triple bond and has two isomeric organic chemical compounds:
1-Butyne (ethylacetylene)

2-Butyne (dimethylacetylene)

See also
 Butane (C4H10)
 Butene (C4H8)